Shing Fui-On (成奎安; 1 February 1955 – 27 August 2009) was a Hong Kong actor, best known for his supporting roles in Hong Kong cinema. He had only one leading role in his entire career.

Biography
Shing Fui-On was the fourth of five siblings in a Hakka family. Due to family poverty, Shing had to drop out of school at the age of 13.  At the age of 15, he worked as an extra at Shaw Brothers, and later moved to Golden Harvest before working at a dance hall. Shing Fui-On was an original resident of Sai Kung's Nam Wai Village. In 2003, he was elected the village chief. In 2007, he was elected to the post for a fifth time.

Career
During his film career, Shing is always famous for portraying villains and comedic characters, due to his large stature and deep and grumpy voice. Shing often appeared as a supporting actor in films with Chow Yun-fat including A Better Tomorrow, A Better Tomorrow II, The Killer, Tiger on Beat, Prison on Fire, God of Gamblers and The Greatest Lover (a Hong Kong adaption of the Pygmalion/My Fair Lady plot).  His only lead role was in the 1994 Category III film The Blue Jean Monster. His last feature film role was the 2007 film The Detective. Shing worked on a total of 95 feature films in one four-year span (1988–1991) and earned over 230 credits during his career.

Death
In October 2004, Shing discovered that he had been diagnosed with nasopharyngeal carcinoma, which had already reached his lungs. His condition stabilised after radiation and chemotherapy. However, his mouth was no longer able to produce saliva, and Shing was left with 20% hearing in his right ear. In 2008, Shing's condition worsened. While he had beaten the cancer, he also weighed less than 100 pounds.  Shing died from complications from Hepatitis B resulting in liver cancer on 27 August 2009 at 11:45 p.m. at the Hong Kong Baptist Hospital in Kowloon, Hong Kong.

References

External links
 
 Full profile at HKCinemagic.com

1955 births
2009 deaths
Deaths from esophageal cancer
Deaths from cancer in Hong Kong
Indigenous inhabitants of the New Territories in Hong Kong
Hong Kong people of Hakka descent
People from Xingning
Hong Kong male film actors